José María Errandonea Urtizberea (born 12 December 1940) is a former Spanish professional road bicycle racer. He won a stage in the 1967 Tour de France and wore the maillot jaune for one day. He also won a stage in the 1966 Vuelta a España as well as several stages and the 1968 overall of the Euskal Bizikleta. He also competed in the sprint and team pursuit events at the 1960 Summer Olympics.

Major results

1940
Burgos
1966
Vuelta a España:
Winner stage 1B
1967
Vuelta a España:
Winner stage 1B (with Jan Janssen)
Tour de France:
Winner stage 1A (prologue)
Wearing yellow jersey for one day
1968
Vuelta a España:
Winner stage 9
1970
Vuelta a España:
Winner stage 18

References

External links
 Complete Palmares of  José María Errandonea
 
 Official Tour de France results for José María Errandonea

1940 births
Living people
Cyclists from the Basque Country (autonomous community)
Spanish Tour de France stage winners
Spanish Vuelta a España stage winners
Sportspeople from Irun
Tour de Suisse stage winners
Spanish male cyclists
Olympic cyclists of Spain
Cyclists at the 1960 Summer Olympics